Chester Earl "Chet" Holifield (December 3, 1903 – February 6, 1995) was a businessman and politician, a United States representative from California's 19th congressional district. He was known for his work on issues of atomic energy.

He was born in Mayfield, Graves County, Kentucky. He moved with his family to Springdale, Arkansas in 1912. After attending public schools, he moved to Montebello, California in 1920. There he worked in the manufacture and selling of men's apparel from 1920 to 1943.

Becoming active in Democratic Party politics, Holifield was chair of the Los Angeles County Democratic Central committee of the 51st District from 1934 to 1938. He was chair of the California State Central committee of the 12th congressional district from 1938 to 1940. He was also a delegate to each Democratic National Convention from 1940 to 1964.

Holifield was elected as a Democrat representing the 19th congressional district to the 78th and to the fifteen succeeding Congresses. He served from January 3, 1943 until his resignation on December 31, 1974. He was not a candidate for reelection in 1974 to the 94th Congress.

Holifield resumed the manufacture and selling of men's apparel after leaving Congress. He died on February 6, 1995.

Nuclear policy 

While in Congress, he was chair of the U.S. House Committee on Government Operations (91st through 93rd Congresses) and the Joint Committee on Atomic Energy (87th, 89th, and 91st Congresses). He was a member of the President's Special Evaluation Commission on Atomic Bomb Tests at Bikini Atoll, 1946.

In the late 1950s and early 1960s, as a member of the House Military Operations Subcommittee, he was a strong advocate of fallout shelters and said that the United States should "build a nationwide system of underground shelters". Holifield was also a congressional adviser to international conferences on uses of atomic energy, nuclear weapons testing, water desalinization, and disarmament.

Alvin M. Weinberg, who advocated inherent safety in reactor design, recounted an incident from 1972, where Holifield said: "if you are concerned about the safety of reactors, then I think it may be time for you to leave nuclear energy."

Legacy and honors
In 1966, he was awarded the Honorary Doctor of Laws (L.L. D.) from Whittier College.
The Chet Holified Library, named in his honor, opened 1969 in Montebello, California.
The Chet Holifield Federal Building in Laguna Niguel, California was renamed in his honor in 1978.

References

Bibliography
 Dyke, Richard Wayne. Mr. Atomic Energy: Congressman Chet Holifield and Atomic Energy Affairs from 1945 to 1974. New York: Greenwood Press, 1989; Dyke, Richard Wayne and Francis X. Gannon.
Chet Holifield: Master Legislator and Nuclear Statesman. With a foreword by Gerald R. Ford and an afterword by Carl Albert. Lanham, [Md.]: University Press of America, 1996.

External links

 

1903 births
1995 deaths
People from Mayfield, Kentucky
Democratic Party members of the United States House of Representatives from California
People from Springdale, Arkansas
People from Montebello, California
Haberdashers
20th-century American politicians